John Venn D.D. (died 8 October 1687) was an English academic administrator at the University of Oxford.

Venn was elected Master (head) of Balliol College, Oxford on  24 April 1678, a post he held until his death in 1687.
During his time as Master of Balliol, he was also Vice-Chancellor of Oxford University from 1686 until 1687.

References

Year of birth missing
1687 deaths
Masters of Balliol College, Oxford
Vice-Chancellors of the University of Oxford